The Type XIV U-boat was a modification of the Type IXD, designed to resupply other U-boats, being the only submarine tenders built which were not surface ships. It was nicknamed the "Milchkuh/Milchkühe (pl.)" (milk cows) or U-Tanker.

Design
German Type XIV submarines were shortened and deepened versions of the Type IXDs. The boats had a displacement of  when at the surface and  while submerged. They had two shafts and two propellers.

The boats were not fitted with torpedo tubes nor deck guns. The only armament was for defense, consisting of two  SK C/30 anti-aircraft guns with 2500 rounds as well as a  C/30 gun with 3,000 rounds.

The boats had a complement of fifty-three.

Operation
In addition, the boats were equipped with a small bakery in order to provide the luxury of fresh bread for crews being resupplied. The Type XIV also had a doctor and medical facility for injured sailors, and even had a two-man brig to imprison sailors awaiting discipline back at home. Type IXC boats otherwise only carried 12 weeks of food supplies, and Type VIIC U-boat carried about 114 tons of diesel fuel.

Cargo was transported by means of a  inflatable boat and portable cranes. The flat main deck with cargo hatches and davits was designed in theory to facilitate the transfer of bulk supplies, however its low freeboard made this work extremely hazardous in typical North Atlantic swells that made the deck awash, so often supplies had to be hand-lifted through the smaller but dryer conning tower hatches to avoid flooding the boat. Resupply and refueling operations often took hours, putting both the milk cow and the submarine it was servicing at risk.

If the Germans came under Allied attack during a resupply operation, the milk cow would dive first while the attack submarine might fight it out on the surface for a while, as the Type XIV's bulk and flat deck made it slower to maneuver and submerge, although it could dive deeper than Type VIICs or IX. The Type XIV had no torpedo tubes or deck guns, only defensive armament of anti-aircraft guns.

In 1942, the milk cows enabled Type VIIC boats to remain on station for a couple more weeks off of the American coast during the "Second Happy Time" raids of the Battle of the Atlantic.

The milk cows were priority targets for Allied forces, as sinking one milk cow would effectively curtail the patrols of a dozen attack U-boats and force them to return home for supplies. Ultra intercepts provided information concerning sailing and routing of the milk cows. This intelligence, coupled with improved Allied radar, air coverage, and hunter-killer groups in the North Atlantic, eliminated most of the milk cows during 1943 including four lost in the month of July alone. By the end of the war all ten had been sunk. Milk cow duty was especially hazardous; 289 sailors were killed out of an estimated complement of 530–576 men.

List of Type XIV submarines 
Ten boats of this type were commissioned:
 , commissioned on 15 November 1941, scuttled on 24 July 1943
 , commissioned on 24 December 1941, sunk on 4 October 1943
 , commissioned on 30 January 1942, sunk on 30 July 1943
 , commissioned on 5 March 1942, sunk on 30 July 1943
 , commissioned on 2 April 1942, sunk on 16 May 1943
 , commissioned on 30 April 1942, scuttled on 20 August 1942
 , commissioned on 21 December 1942, sunk on 13 July 1943
 , commissioned on 1 February 1943, sunk on 26 April 1944
 , commissioned on 8 March 1943, sunk on 4 August 1943
 , commissioned on 27 March 1943, sunk on 12 June 1944

Fourteen planned Type XIVs were cancelled. Three of them (U-491, U-492, U-493) were about 75% complete when work was stopped in 1944. The other eleven boats had not been laid down when they were cancelled on 27 May 1944. On that same day Karl Dönitz stopped construction on the Type XX U-boats, large transport boats that would not have been ready until mid-1945.

Citations

Bibliography

External links
 
 

 
Submarine classes
Type 014
Auxiliary depot ship classes